Venezuelans form one of the main immigrant groups in Spain, which is also the European country to which most Venezuelans choose to migrate because of shared language, customs and family ties. Similarly to nationals from other countries of Ibero-America, Venezuelans of origin are allowed to apply for dual Spanish citizenship after two years of legal residence in Spain. In addition, Venezuelans who are children or grandchildren of Spanish citizens can legally obtain Spanish citizenship from their countries of origin, an option open to over 3 million Venezuelans.

History 
As a former part of the Spanish Empire in the Americas and a major destination of Spanish emigration up until the second half of the 20th century, Venezuela shares strong ties with Spain.

After Hugo Chávez came to power following the 1998 Venezuelan presidential election many upper-class Venezuelans decided to leave the country, a movement that intensified with the failure of the 2002 coup against President Chávez.
Some estimated 100,000 Venezuelans settled in Madrid, assimilating well into Spanish society due to common Hispanic ethnicity and family ties.

Venezuelan-born population in Spain (including dual nationals)

Notable people

See also 
 Immigration to Spain
 Spain–Venezuela relations
 Spaniards in Venezuela
 Venezuelan people

References 

Spain

Ethnic groups in Spain